The Facebook Effect is a book by David Kirkpatrick and published by Simon & Schuster. It describes the history of Facebook and its social implications.

The book was shortlisted for the 2010 Financial Times and Goldman Sachs Business Book of the Year Award.

It describes how Facebook went from a dorm-room novelty to a company with 500 million users, and how Mark Zuckerberg stayed focused on growth even when it meant to raise money from investors selling the company equity.

References

External links
 Harkin, James, "Review: The Facebook Effect by David Kirkpatrick", The Observer, Sunday 18 July 2010
 Arrington, Michael, "Review: Kirkpatrick’s The Facebook Effect Is A Wonderfully Biased History Of Facebook", Techcrunch, Jun 24, 2010
 nugget reviews, Mark Zuckerberg’s truth: Why do we choose Facebook? 
 "The Facebook Effect" preview at Google Books
 

2010 non-fiction books
Works about Facebook